A general election was held in the U.S. state of Rhode Island on November 6, 2018. The party primaries for the election occurred on September 12, 2018. All of Rhode Island's executive officers went up for election as well as Rhode Island's Class I U.S. Senate seat and both of Rhode Island's two seats in the United States House of Representatives.

Governor

Incumbent Democratic Governor Gina Raimondo sought re-election to a second term and won, defeating Republican Allan Fung in a rematch.

Results

Lieutenant Governor
Incumbent Democratic Lieutenant Governor of Rhode Island Daniel McKee sought and won re-election to a second term.

Democratic primary
Dan McKee, Incumbent Democratic Lieutenant Governor of Rhode Island
Aaron Regunberg, State Representative (4th District, East Side, Providence)

The two had a debate on WPRI on September 7, 2018.

Results

Republican primary
Paul Pence, Senior Specialist in Quality Management systems and Food Safety at Toray Plastics

Results

General election

Results

Attorney General
Incumbent Democratic Attorney General Peter Kilmartin was term-limited and could not run for re-election to a third term in office.

Democratic primary

Declared
Peter Neronha, former U.S. Attorney of the District of Rhode Island

Results

General election

Results

Secretary of State
Incumbent Democratic Secretary of State Nellie Gorbea won re-election to a second term.

Democratic primary

Results

Republican primary

Results

General election

Predictions

Results

General Treasurer
Incumbent Democratic General Treasurer Seth Magaziner won re-election to a second term.

Democratic primary

Results

Republican primary
Declared
Michael Riley, investment advisor

Results

General election

Results

United States Senate

Incumbent Democratic Senator Sheldon Whitehouse won reelection to a third term.

Results

United States House of Representatives

Both of Rhode Island's two seats in the United States House of Representatives will be up for election in 2018.

References

External links
 
Candidates at Vote Smart 
Candidates at Ballotpedia
Campaign finance at OpenSecrets

Official Lieutenant Governor campaign websites
Ross McCurdy (I) for Lt. Governor
Dan McKee (D) for Lt. Governor
Paul Pence (R) for Lt. Governor

Official Attorney General campaign websites
Peter Neronha (D) for Attorney General

Official Secretary of State campaign websites
Pat Cortellessa (R) for Secretary of State
Nellie Gorbea (D) for Secretary of State

Official General Treasurer campaign websites
Seth Magaziner (D) for Treasurer
Michael Riley (R) for Treasurer